Boumagueur (Berber: ⴱⵓⵎⴰⴳⴻⵔ) is a town in northeast of Algeria. Area of the town is 111.69 km2, 8474 people live there, density of population is 76/km2.

The climate prevailing in this region is very dry and hot, summer extends up to six months, there is cold and rainy winter, which range from 15 days to 20 days.

Localities of the town 
The town of Boumagueur consists of 11 localities.:

 Hassoune, capital of the town.
 Ouled Bouradi.
 Chantout (College).
 Al Feidh (Ouled Sahraoui).
 Sihcine.
 Al Khoualed.
 Megounssa (south).
 Lahnanchia.
 Al Keidh.
 Lahrakta.
 Al Bourat.
 bouraguba.
 el-ghar.

Borders 
 East: Ouled Aouf, Ouled Si Slimane.
 West: Djezzar, Barika.
 North: N'Gaous, Gosbat.
 South: Sefiane.

Languages 
All of the inhabitants can speak Shawia.

References

Communes of Batna Province
Batna Province